Chimney Bay is a natural bay located on the east coast of the Great Northern Peninsula, Newfoundland, Canada. It is one of two narrow indrafts of Canada Bay, the other being Bide Arm. The promontory that separates Chimney Bay from Bide Arm is moderately high. The south extreme is called Lard Point, from which the coast curves northwestward to Lard Cove, and then to Marten Point, the east point of the entrance to Chimney Bay. This coast is rugged and fringed by rocks.

References
 This article includes text incorporated from United States Hydrographic Office & R. G. Davenport's "Newfoundland and Labrador: The coast and banks of Newfoundland and the coast of Labrador, from Grand Point to the Koksoak River, with the adjacent islands and banks" (1884), a publication now in the public domain.

Bays of Newfoundland and Labrador